Witchcraft traditionally means the use of magic or supernatural powers to harm others. 

Witchcraft may also refer to:

Film
 Witchcraft (1916 film), a lost 1916 American drama silent film
 Witchcraft (1964 film), a horror film starring Lon Chaney Jr.
 Witchcraft (film series), a horror film series
 Witchcraft (1988 film), the first film in the series
 La Casa 4, 1988 horror film starring Linda Blair and David Hasselhoff also released as Witchcraft

Music
 Witchcraft (band), a Swedish band

Albums
 Witchcraft (Witchcraft album), 2004
 Witchcraft (Stormwitch album), 2004
 Witchcraft (Obtained Enslavement album), 1997
 Witchcraft (John Abercrombie album), 1991
 Witchcraft (Claire Martin and Richard Rodney Bennett album), 2010

Songs
 "Witchcraft" (1955 song), a 1955 song by Dave Bartholomew and Pearl King which was an R&B hit that year for The Spiders and a 1963 B-side hit for Elvis Presley
 "Witchcraft" (1957 song), a 1957 song by Cy Coleman and Carolyn Leigh, best known in a recording by Frank Sinatra
"Witchcraft" (Pendulum song), 2010
 "Witchcraft" (Book of Love song), 1989

Other uses
 Witchcraft (clipper), a California clipper ship built in 1850 in Salem, Massachusetts
 Witchcraft, a cabin cruiser owned by Miami hotelier Dan Burack that disappeared in 1967
 "Witchcraft", the codename given to the intelligence produced by the source Merlin, in John le Carré's novel Tinker Tailor Soldier Spy

See also
Witch (disambiguation)
 CJ Carella's WitchCraft, a role-playing game
Wicca